Valeriia Oleksiivna Hontareva, also spelled as Valeria Hontareva and Valeria Gontareva, (born 20 October 1964 in Dnipropetrovsk) was Governor or Chairwoman of the National Bank of Ukraine. She submitted her resignation on 10 April 2017 and left the bank on 11 May 2017.

Early life and career
Hontareva was born on 20 October 1964 in Dnipropetrovsk. She graduated in 1987 from Kyiv Polytechnic Institute and in 1997 from Kyiv National Economic University with a master's degree in Economics.

After obtaining her degree in 1987, she was a junior researcher at the Ukrainian Centre for Standardization and Metrology for two years, and from 1989 to 1993, Hontareva worked as a design engineer in the institute "Hiprostrommashyna". In 1993 Hontareva started her career in the financial sector and she held top positions in the Kyiv branches of ING Bank and Societe Generale.

In 1996 she became director of resource management at Societe Generale in Ukraine and in 2001 deputy chairman of ING Bank (in 2007 for six months first deputy). From 2007 to 2014, she served as Chairwoman of then Investment Capital Ukraine (now ICU), Kyiv based financial group.

She officially sold her stakes in the company before becoming governor of the NBU.
President Poroshenko hired for the sale of his Roshen holding her former employer company ICU beside Rothschild Group.

In her official public income declaration for 2013, Hontareva stated an income of 3.884.679 UAH, a car park with an Infinity FX35, a Porsche Cayenne, a Porsche Panamera, a Toyota Landcruiser, and several real estates. According to Hontareva's e-declaration for 2016, her total income amounted to UAH 57 mln (the most of which was due to the third tranche of selling her shares in ICU Holdings Limited - UAH 52,57 mln).

Governor of the National Bank of Ukraine
On 19 June 2014 Hontareva replaced Stepan Kubiv as Governor of the National Bank of Ukraine. Hontareva is the first female to lead the bank.

For the time of Hontareva's work in the NBU, hryvnia depreciated almost three times.

International financial institutions representatives state that the biggest reform achievement in Ukraine under Hontareva's rule has been the clean-up of the banking system with the grand finale of the nationalization of Privatbank.

Hontareva had reduced the size of the central bank bureaucracy from 12,000 to 5,000. She has let the country's currency, the hryvnia, float, which stabilized the economy. And, above all, in an effort to clean up the ailing banking sector, she has named 87 banks insolvent with about 60 percent of the sector's assets. According to the EBRD managing director (Eastern Europe and the Caucasus) Francis Malige, Hontareva is No. 1 changemaker in Ukraine.

The National Anti-corruption Bureau of Ukraine (NABU) has opened criminal proceedings in a case, which according to them involved Hontareva's Deputy Kateryna Rozhkova, regarding the 'Platinum Bank's' withdrawal from the market. Hontareva was accused of deliberately bringing the bank to bankruptcy, and of speculation on the growth of the dollar exchange rate. The rallies from the allegedly deceived depositors of the failed banks repeatedly gathered outside the National Bank of Ukraine.
Hontareva has a good reputation among professionals as the Ukrainian central bank for the first time started to act independently from the interests of oligarchs and politicians. She fulfilled modern monetary policy similar to the policy of the European Central Bank or the United States’ Federal Reserve System moving to targeting inflation instead of targeting exchange rates. On the contrary, the predecessors of Hontareva on firsthand wanted to maintain the stable national currency exchange rate.

On 10 April 2017, Hontareva submitted her resignation. On 11 May 2017, while still not formally dismissed, she left the bank and Deputy Governor Yakiv Smoliy took over her duties.

“My mission is complete. First, the country has moved to a flexible exchange rate and implemented a new monetary policy of inflation targeting. Secondly, the banking system has been cleansed of insolvent banks, and its future resilience strengthened. Thirdly, the National Bank has been completely transformed, all the processes have been reset and today our central bank is a strong modern organization,” Valeriia Hontareva concluded during her resignation announcement.

During her nearly three years in office, the National Bank headed by Valeriia Hontareva has succeeded in stabilizing the macroeconomic situation, fundamentally transforming the banking sector landscape and building a modern central bank despite war and political instability, deep economic crisis, and empty government treasury.

On 1 October 2018 Hontareva  became a member of the Institute of Global Affairs, an initiative of the London School of Economics.

28.03.2019 right before the 2nd round of the presidential election, a new agency UNIAN published fake news "In particular, Gontareva, together with ICU top manager Konstantin Stetsenko, is charged with 'assisting in a criminal organization and assisting in the illegal seizure of another's property – monetary funds of PJSC Agrarian Fund worth UAH 2.069 billion through the conclusion by JSC Brokbusinessbank of fake contracts of sale and purchase of government domestic loan bonds with the Agrarian Fund under direct repurchase agreements with the National Bank of Ukraine".
The press secretary of the General Prosecutor's office Andrey Lysenko in a comment to Hromadske denied the information about the announcement of suspicions around President Petro Poroshenko, in particular the former head of the presidential administration [Boris Lozhkin], the former head of the NBU Valeria Hontareva and the deputy head of the Presidential Administration Alexei Filatov.

Private life
Hontareva is married and has two sons; Anton born in 1988 and Mykyta born in 2000.
2018 she moved to London.

Notes

References

External links
 of the National Bank of Ukraine 

Governors of the National Bank of Ukraine
1964 births
Living people
Businesspeople from Dnipro
Ukrainian bankers
Women bankers
Kyiv Polytechnic Institute alumni
Kyiv National Economic University alumni
Ukrainian businesspeople in the United Kingdom
Recipients of the Honorary Diploma of the Cabinet of Ministers of Ukraine